Natural light may refer to:
Daylight
Sunlight
Moonlight
Natural Light, a brand of beer

See also
Daylighting, the use of daylight to illuminate interior spaces